Hulstina grossbecki is a species of geometrid moth in the family Geometridae. It is found in North America.

The MONA or Hodges number for Hulstina grossbecki is 6545.

References

Further reading

 

Boarmiini
Articles created by Qbugbot
Moths described in 1970